Brigadier D. H. Tadman was a British military personnel and a former Chief of Army Staff of the Ghana Army.

References

Chiefs of Army Staff (Ghana)